Christian Dorosario (born 25 September 1953) is a Senegalese sprinter. He competed in the men's 200 metres at the 1976 Summer Olympics.

References

1953 births
Living people
Athletes (track and field) at the 1972 Summer Olympics
Athletes (track and field) at the 1976 Summer Olympics
Senegalese male sprinters
Olympic athletes of Senegal
Place of birth missing (living people)